Abassad was a bishop and martyr of the early Christian church. After being tortured, he was beheaded by the command of Arrianus under Diocletian. His feast day is December 23.

References

Sources
Holweck, F. G. A Biographical Dictionary of the Saints. St. Louis, MO: B. Herder Book Co. 1924.

Egyptian bishops
Year of birth unknown
Year of death unknown
Saints from Roman Egypt
4th-century Christian martyrs
4th-century Romans